Velilla de Jiloca is a municipality on the river Jiloca, located in the province of Zaragoza, Aragon, Spain. According to the 2008 census (INE), the municipality has a population of 108 inhabitants.

References

Municipalities in the Province of Zaragoza